Arnaes Odelín (born 1998) is a Cuban judoka. She is the current Pan American champion in the 57 kg category.

In 2019, Odelín competed in the 2019 Pan American Judo Championships and competitions in Tashkent, Brasilia and Osaka.

In 2020, she competed in Grand Slam tournaments in Paris and Dusseldorf. Odelín won bronze in the 57 kg category at the 2020 Pan American Judo Championships, winning against Jéssica Pereira but losing to Miryam Roper. She then won gold at the 2021 Pan American Judo Championships, beating Amelia Fulgentes, Leilani Akiyama and Ketelyn Nascimento.

Odelín competed at the 2021 World Judo Championships in the 57kg category, but was knocked out in the third round by Canadian judoka Jessica Klimkait, the eventual winner. She was also part of Costa Rica's team in the mixed team category, but lost her match to Eteri Liparteliani in the qualification stages.

She won silver in the 2022 Pan American-Oceania Judo Championships in Lima, only being beaten by Jessica Lima.

References

1998 births
Living people
Cuban female judoka
21st-century Cuban women
20th-century Cuban women